3-Acetyloxymorphone is an opioid analgesic which has never been marketed.  It is an acetyl derivative of oxymorphone and is an intermediate in the synthesis of several related drugs.

References

Acetate esters
Opioids